Chalow or Chelow or Chelu may refer to:
 Chalow, East Azerbaijan
 Chelow, Chaharmahal and Bakhtiari
 Chelu, Kerman
 Chalow-ye Gavmishi
 Chalow Gohreh
 Chelo District
 Chelu Rural District